The Alloy Block is an under-construction a mixed-use development with two buildings in Boerum Hill, Brooklyn, New York City, near Downtown Brooklyn.  The two buildings, at 80 Flatbush Avenue and 100 Flatbush Avenue, will incorporate residential units, two schools, office space, and a retail base. One of the schools will be an expanded facility for Khalil Gibran International Academy, while the other will be a new 350-seat elementary school. Alloy, the developer, is also partnering with BRIC to turn a building on the site that will not be razed into new spaces for the organization.

Planning
The development is planned for a triangular plot in Brooklyn. One of the buildings on the site, a former Civil War infirmary, will be preserved and re-purposed as a cultural facility. The completion of the project was contingent on the rezoning of the site owned by Alloy and the New York City Department of Education so that two towers can be built and floor-area ratio can be tripled.

Housing advocates meanwhile urged approval of the project as necessary to alleviate the city's housing shortage. In August 2018, New York City Council member Stephen Levin announced that he would seek a height reduction. Following a height reduction for both towers, the project was approved by a New York City Council subcommittee in September 2018, and was subsequently approved by the full council.

Construction and changes
As of October 2019, demolition of the site's preexisting structures had begun. The first tower, designated as 100 Flatbush Avenue, was supposed to have been built by 2022, and the second tower would have been completed by 2025. Alloy announced in December 2019 that the first tower would be the first fully-electric mixed-use skyscraper in New York City; the first tower was pushed back to 2023 and the second tower was delayed to 2026.

The project was delayed significantly due to the COVID-19 pandemic in New York City. In May 2021, Alloy announced that, due to a steep decline in office space during the pandemic, the office space at 100 Flatbush Avenue would be scrapped. The number of apartments at 100 Flatbush would increase from 257 to 441. By the middle of that year, the project had received a construction loan of $240 million, allowing work on the project to commence. The development was renamed the Alloy Block. Work on the first tower's foundation started in December 2021. The superstructure of 100 Flatbush was constructed starting in June 2022. The first tower is expected to have 45 affordable apartments and 396 market rate apartments with the address 505 State Street, as well as retail space at 100 Flatbush Avenue.

References

Downtown Brooklyn
Proposed skyscrapers in the United States
Residential buildings in Brooklyn
Skyscrapers in Brooklyn
Proposed buildings and structures in New York City
Boerum Hill